Deioneus is a monotypic genus of shrimp of the family Alpheidae, containing only the species Deioneus sandizelli.

References

Alpheidae
Crustaceans described in 2000